David Charles Rotenberg, is a Canadian author and professor emeritus of theatre studies at York University, where he taught graduate students for over 25 years, as well at the Professional Actors Lab in Toronto, which he founded as the artistic director. David Rotenberg has been referred to as one of Canada's "most notable acting teachers and coaches," and may be the nation's best known master acting teacher. During the formative part of his career, he was a theatre director in New York City and staged two Broadway shows, returning to Toronto in 1987. In 1994, he directed the first Canadian play to be staged in the People's Republic of China, which inspired his career as a novelist, beginning with the five Zhong Fong mysteries set in modern Shanghai as well as the historical fiction novel Shanghai. After writing a series of speculative thrillers set in The Junction, Toronto, He began a science fiction series in 2017.

Early life and education
David Charles Rotenberg was born and raised in Toronto, with three brothers (Lawrence, Robert (Bobby), and Matthew) sons of Jewish parents Dr. Cyril Rotenberg, a physician, and Gertrude Ruth (Gertie) Rotenberg, described as a "woman of initiative, of new ideas and steady values." David Rotenberg attended the University of Toronto and graduated with a Bachelor of Arts. He left Toronto in 1971.

Younger brother Robert studied at the University of Toronto, Osgoode Hall and the London School of Economics, ultimately forging careers as both a criminal lawyer and a crime novelist.

Career

Theatre director and graduate work (1971–1987)
David Rotenberg went to British Columbia, teaching and setting up the acting programme at Simon Fraser University, staging a production of Bertholt Brecht's Baal in 1973.

Rotenberg moved to the US, where he lived for fourteen years. He pursued graduate studies at the Yale Drama School, obtaining his Master of Fine Arts degree in 1976, specializing in directing. He lived ten years in New York City, with lots of freelance directing, plenty of regional theatre, and two Broadway shows: The News, and The 1940's Radio Hour.  Having lived in Manhattan for many years, its influence continued to form the base for some of his work even after returning to Canada.

Rotenberg moved further south, to New Orleans, where he was on the faculty of Tulane University. York University "lured him back to Toronto" with a job he "could not turn down". On a more personal level, Rotenberg moved back to Toronto because he wanted to be closer to his parents and three brothers, and he felt Toronto was a good place to raise children.

Acting teacher and international director (1987- )
Rotenberg made the move back to Toronto in 1987, where he began to teach graduate students. He had expected also to resume his directing career in his hometown, but he got a rude awakening, recalling: "I was effectively shunned," and was told to forget directing in Canada; there was no directing work, and he did not know why: "Perhaps if I'd gone to, let's say, Czechoslovakia to work, I'd have come home hailed as a hero. But that Broadway stint seemed to rankle those who were handing out directing jobs here."I was a professional theatre director ... with two Broadway shows to my credit, dozens of regional theatre credits and I ran a major American regional theatre so it was a bit of shock to me when I returned to Canada, where I'd been born and raised, to find that the Canadian theatre community wanted nothing to do with me. Apparently I was a traitor. If I had spent twenty minutes directing in Eastern Europe rather than twenty years directing in America I believe I would have been welcomed back by the Canadian theatre with open arms.

Rotenberg continued occasionally to direct plays and television in Canada and abroad. In 1994, he received a call asking if he would be interested in directing a play to be produced in Shanghai, in Mandarin. Rotenberg imagined they wanted Shakespeare or a modern master, but it turned out to be Canadian George Ryga's The Ecstasy of Rita Joe: "Apparently, Ryga's play was the only Canadian play they had at hand in translation ... They wanted a Canadian director with varied skills and solid street creds, and someone who could work with students." Rotenberg accepted the engagement to put on the production at the Shanghai Theatre Academy, the first Canadian play to be produced in translation in China with a Chinese cast and creative team. In 2012, Rotenberg recalled that on arrival, he was told "You must remember that you can always be replaced". The Ecstasy of Rita Joe is a contemporary story about a young First Nation woman who leaves the reserve for the big city, but the subject matter was not understood by the Chinese: "They didn't comprehend it at all ... When the set designs arrived, there were Indians with head dresses and war paint." Despite such cultural differences and working in a completely foreign language, the production was nevertheless a "limited success."

Other teaching projects and screen coaching
In 2000, David Rotenberg, together with David Julian Hirsh and entertainment lawyer Michael Levine, sent a proposal to the Canadian Film Centre to create a high-level training program modelled on New York's Lee Strasberg Theatre and Film Institute and on British companies that were training actors who could cross between stage and screen. Eight years later, the CFC announced the creation of a new actor's conservatory to train and market future stars of screen and stage, the first of its kind in Canada, as well as a  separate international co-production training program, the Canada-U.K. Script Incubation Program, designed to foster cross-Atlantic collaboration between script writers with support from the BBC and CanWest.

In the meantime, in 2004, Rotenberg had founded the Professional Actors Lab, Canada's most successful actor training program, with nearly 200 actors per term. For some time, two evenings a week, he has also been teaching a group of about a dozen hand-picked students in a small room "tucked into the basement" of St. Anne's Parish Hall, in Toronto's West End: Equity Showcase Theatre's Acting for the Camera class. Between the three institutions in which he has been directly involved, Rotenberg typically has spent between 25 and 40 hours every week training and prepping actors. At any given time, Rotenberg was working personally with about 75 actors: "Hundreds of his St. Anne's alumni currently work full-time on projects in Los Angeles, New York City, Toronto and Vancouver." Among them are Canadian actors Tatiana Maslany, Rachel McAdams, Scott Speedman, Sarah Gadon, Ennis Esmer, Patrick J. Adams, David Julian Hirsh, Jonas Chernick, Shawn Doyle, Polly Shannon, and Demore Barnes. Many travel back to Toronto for Rotenberg's advice.

Rotenberg has also taught at the National Theatre School of Canada, the University of Cape Town, and Princeton, and regularly teaches professional classes in other cities in North America. He served as acting coach for My Secret Identity and Friday the 13th: The Series and as a private acting coach for the new Kung Fu on CBS.

Theory of acting and pedagogical technique

Rotenberg's teaching approach began with an observation:There had been almost no serious intellectual thought given to how the form actually works. And actors had bought into the mediocrity that had been fed to them. Actors had actually agreed to call what they do a craft rather than an art. But surely an actor who plays Laertes in a production of Hamlet has way more to do with the success or failure of the evening than the third violinist has to do with the success or failure of a Beethoven symphony. Yet, you would never hear a violist refer to what they do as a craft—never! So I started changing that, inventing new ways for actors to understand their art...In the parish hall basement, Rotenberg would quietly observe as his students videotaped themselves performing short scenes in pairs or on their own, gathering around a television set to watch the tape afterwards, and he would step in, offering blunt but constructive criticism of their scene, at the same time protecting their fragile egos with his humour - and his acuity as a teacher. One of his students, having worked with Rotenberg for six years, often travelling home from Los Angeles to take his classes, said Rotenberg is "great at making us see our strengths and weaknesses."

Author (1998- )
The "shunning" Rotenberg felt from the Toronto theatrical community pushed him toward writing, both film scripts, at least 
five of which have been optioned by film companies, stage plays, such as his adaptation of The Great Gatsby, which he directed at both York and Penn State University, and his highly successful novels. In his words, "this shunning sent me to writing, so it worked out for the best." An early example is his original screenplay Ambition's Debt, which he was also minded to direct using only Canadian talent to fill the credits.

Novels
Rotenberg was inspired to write his first novel after his time with the Shanghai Theatre Academy, at a time when China was going through a "massive transition from a profoundly oppressive socialist state to a basically free market economy – a thrilling time." It set the stage for his critically acclaimed first novel, the thriller The Shanghai Murders (1998), followed by four more in his mystery series: The Lake Ching Murders (2001), The Hua Shan Hospital Murders (shortlisted for the Arthur Ellis Award for the best crime novel of 2003), The Hamlet Murders (2004) and The Golden Mountain Murders (2005). The five Zhong Fong novels have "legions of fans around the world," and the series is reported as having been optioned for film and television (HBO).

Just before The Golden Mountain Murders was published, the author received a lunch invitation from Penguin Canada publisher David Davidar and assumed that they would be discussing a sixth Zhong Fong novel, but Davidar had other ideas: "They wanted me to do for Shanghai what James Clavell had done for Hong Kong." The end result was Shanghai: The Ivory Compact (2008, "just in time for the Beijing Games"), his critically acclaimed epic novel spanning thousands of years. Rotenberg wrote it as three novels, and counts them as such, but Penguin decided to publish it in one volume. At about 800,000 words, it is one of the longest novels ever published; Rotenberg said he received complaints from readers that it was "too heavy for them to carry around". The success of Shanghai, according to Stephen Patrick Clare, demonstrated that Rotenberg could "break away from convention without loosening his hold on the imagination of his readers." The novel has been reported as being optioned by Darius Films and by Jane McLean for television.

For his next novel series, The Junction Chronicles, Rotenberg moved away from the Shanghai setting in favour of The Junction, the Toronto neighbourhood where he grew up and to which he later returned, as, "it was finally time to look around and try to write about home." While the primary setting for the series is The Junction, a lot of the action in the first novel, The Placebo Effect (2012), takes place in New York, where Rotenberg also lived for many years. Robert J. Wiersema called it a "somewhat workmanlike" thriller "possessed of  an enthralling undercurrent that allows it to transcend its genre and shine on its own terms", and that Rotenberg "reveals a surprising depth and intricacy, not in the mechanics of his plot, but at the level of characterization." The same year, Peter Worthington included Rotenberg "among the best writers of their genre [the thriller,] in the English-speaking world today". The trilogy has been optioned by producer Don Kurt for television.

In a 2012 interview, Rotenberg said he had been working on another trilogy for ten years, titled The Dream Navigators. Five years later, the first book of his third novel series, The Dream Chronicles, set in the future, was published by iBooks in 2017, followed by the second in 2019.

Projects in development
In 2008, Rotenberg talked about books he was either working on or considering: a sixth Zhong Fong novel, a sequel to Shanghai set in post-Second World War Shanghai, contingent on a return visit to the city for more research; and a who's who of Canadian acting talent who have studied with Rotenberg over the years.

Influences and writing process
In the 2012 interview, when asked who his literary influences were, Rotenberg listed John Le Carré, Jack Miles, James Lee Burke, Thomas Cahill, Harlan Ellison, William Boyd, Annie Proulx, K.C. Constantine, and James Crumley, as well as playwright Robert Litz, who approached him in New York to work on a screenplay together, and a "junior high school English teacher named Mr. Gallanders ... who encouraged me to read and write." He went on to include Aaron Sorkin and Bob Dylan, "especially when he's not singing his songs."

As his first five novels were police procedurals, he purposefully had his writing space cluttered with images and books: "two large modern desks at right angles to each other — the whole thing dominated by a large computer monitor. It felt that the job was to produce order from the chaos — just as police officers must." For The Junction Chronicles, he felt he needed a different kind of workspace for a different kind of literary work, "spare — filled with leaps in time and space, often defying normal rules of storytelling", pushing the boundaries: "Here the job has to do with entering blank spaces — creating from whole cloth." It took him seven weeks and three days of "intense looking" to find the desk for his new office. Made from reclaimed wood, and only   a foot and a half deep and about four and half feet long, it is "a piece of art in and of itself." The desk has no drawers or file cabinets nor in and out trays, just a small laptop. "Even the hard copies of what I've written ...  kept in a book shelf out of the room."

Theory of novel authorship and sources of inspiration
Rotenberg never considered writing his novels as stage- or screenplays, as he thinks of the novel as the "mother" of all genres: "A novel that makes sense is somehow more satisfying to me than a three-act play, and not as contrived or as constrained as a movie script. And my primary interest as a writer is in character rather than plot." Teaching acting has been an important aspect of his writing, an "anchor":I learn a lot from talented actors every week. Their insights and dedication are extraordinary and a great many of them are avid readers, often chiding me to get on with the next book because they've waited long enough to find out what the hung boy is about or why there are so many churches along Annette Street or will Yslan and Decker ever get together. As well, Rotenberg's characters and their exceptional talents are often drawn from his students:When I teach acting, periodically I come across people who really do have special gifts. There are people you can see are working their butts off, but you're never sure they're going to make more than the grade ...  They are generally people who are instinctively in touch with deeper spiritual currents.Finally, Rotenberg's principal career path has had a more straightforward influence on his writing:I've been asked for years to write a book about the unique way that I teach acting. But every time I've sat down at my computer I've wanted to write fiction, not a how-to book, so instead I've integrated my knowledge of acting teaching into my novels. Geoffrey Hyland in two of the five Shanghai mysteries has come to Shanghai to direct a production of Twelfth Night (I've directed it twice myself) and Decker Roberts, the lead in the Junction Chronicles series ... actually teaches in the acting studio that I started in Toronto—Pro Actors Lab.

Canadian crime stories, whodunits and thrillers have been increasing in popularlity since the turn of the 21st century, a market previously dominated by British, American, and more recently, Scandinavian novelists. David Rotenberg believes Canadians have had time to avoid mistakes other crime and mystery writers have made: "The Brits and Scandinavians are less interested in social context than we are ... The whodunit aspect interests me less than the social and historical forces at work in a mystery story. Hamlet would be just another whodunit if you stripped it of context, and it would have nothing important to say."

Personal life
Rotenberg has resided in Toronto since his return from the US in 1987, in The Junction, with his wife Susan Santiago, a Puerto Rican American. They have two adult children, both dual citizens, Elizabeth Sara (Beth) and Joe, after whom he named his production company, "Joe and Beth and She and Me Productions Ltd." Beth was born only a few months after Rotenberg's move back to Toronto. She also writes, and her father expressed an interest in working with her on a project in the 2012 interview.

One of his three brothers, Robert Rotenberg is a criminal lawyer and former magazine editor and an author of legal thrillers. Agent Michael Levine represents both authors.
His mother and father passed in 1999 and 2009, respectively.

Bibliography

Novels
Zhong Fong mysteries
The Shanghai Murders (1998)
The Lake Ching Murders (2001)
The Hua Shan Hospital Murders (2003)
The Hamlet Murders (2004)
The Golden Mountain Murders (2005)

Shanghai (2008)

The Junction Chronicles
The Placebo Effect (2012)
A Murder of Crows (2013)
The Glass House (2014)

The Dream Chronicles
Book 1 (2017)
Book 2 (2019)

Selected drama
Original screenplays and teleplays
Ambition's Debt (optioned by Shaftesbury Films as writer/director)
Gliders (commissioned by Sy Maloney and Associates; unproduced)
YYZ (commissioned by Metaphore Productions; unproduced)
Providence (commissioned by Berryman Production Group; unproduced)
8 episodes of Missing Treasures (Global)
6 episodes of Actor's Notes (Bravo!)

Stage adaptations
Dwarf • based on The Dwarf, a novel by Pär Lagerkvist, York University and Equity Showcase
Lady in the Lake • based on The Lady in the Lake a novel by Raymond Chandler,York University
Lulu • based on a character in two plays by Frank Wedekind, Equity Showcase
The Great Gatsby (2008) • based on The Great Gatsby by F. Scott Fitzgerald, Classical Theatre Project

Notes

References

Canadian theatre directors
Canadian male novelists
Canadian male screenwriters
Year of birth missing (living people)
Living people
20th-century Canadian novelists
21st-century Canadian novelists